Poskin (also Cosgrove, Poskin Lake) is an unincorporated community in the town of Clinton, Barron County, Wisconsin, United States.

History
Poskin was platted in 1887, and named for Mary Poskin, the wife of a businessperson in the lumber industry. Poskin had a post office, which opened on March 30, 1887, and closed on July 10, 1993.

References

External links

Unincorporated communities in Barron County, Wisconsin
Unincorporated communities in Wisconsin